Meye is a surname. Notable people with this surname include:

 Axel Méyé (born 1995), Gabonese football player
 François Meye, Gabonese politician
 Geoffrey Meye (born 1982), Dutch football player
 John Meye, also spelled May, (died 1598), English academic and churchman
 , German football player
 Roguy Méyé (born 1986), Gabonese football player